Joe Wood may refer to:

 Smoky Joe Wood (1889–1985), American baseball player
 Joe T. Wood (1922–2019), American politician
 Joe Wood (infielder) (1919–1985), American baseball player 
 Joe Wood (1944 pitcher) (1916–2002), American baseball player
 Joe Wood (footballer) (1904–1972), Australian footballer for North Melbourne
 Joe Wood (musician) (fl. c. 1980), singer among band T.S.O.L.'s second complement of musicians

See also
 Joseph Wood (disambiguation)